Robert Gibanel (6 July 1932 – 28 September 2021) was a French professional racing cyclist. He rode in two editions of the Tour de France.

References

External links
 

1932 births
2021 deaths
French male cyclists
Sportspeople from Pyrénées-Atlantiques
Cyclists from Nouvelle-Aquitaine
20th-century French people